Esteban Abada High School is a public high school located in Sampaloc, Manila in the Philippines.

History

The establishment of Esteban Abada High School was proposed in 1960 by former Manila Councilor Ernesto Maceda to the Municipal Board after finding out that a vacant government lot with an area of 4,197.5 square meters in his district was earmarked for a school site. The proposal was approved in 1961 as Ordinance No. 4414 by then Vice Mayor and Municipal Board Presiding Officer Hon. Antonio Villegas, who at that time was acting mayor in the absence of Mayor Arsenio H. Lacson.

The school was named after the late Senator Esteban R. Abada (1896 – 1954), an eminent statesman and former Secretary of Education from 1946 to 1949.

On July 1, 1963, Esteban Abada High School joined the city's roster of public high schools. It opened its doors to the public and accommodated the first batch of 720 first year students serviced by 28 teachers. However, instead of celebrating founding anniversaries every July 1, school authorities opted to celebrate "Abada Day" annually on the 15th day of March. Sen. Abada was born on March 15, 1896.

Mr. Emiliano Rafael, the first principal, felt the need to serve the community's working youth. He proposed the establishment of night academic classes with an initial enrollment of 58 freshmen and 30 sophomores.

Mrs. Gorgonia G. Capino succeeded Mr. Rafael who was later promoted as assistant superintendent. Mrs. Capino, the longest serving principal of the school was head of school from 1964 to 1976. She is always remembered by former teachers and students for her sense of fairness and subtlety of approach. During her time, The Guidepost and Ang Sinag, the official English and Filipino Papers of the school made waves in the arena of school journalism. Aside from producing winners in the divisional and regional contests, the campus journalists and the school papers were adjudged winners in the National Secondary Schools Press Conferences. Students’ outstanding performances were highlighted by winnings in various fields including national championship awards in First Aid Competition, Annual Division Science Fair and others. The school library has consistently increased its book collection and enriched its periodical files, making it the 3rd Best Library in the City of Manila in the Circa ’70.

Mr. Emiliano B. Mendoza made a short stint as principal from 1976 – 1978. It was in 1979 during the incumbency of Miss Adela F. Mejorada when the school produce champion students and teachers. The EAHS all-male choir was the champion in Metro Manila Himig ’79. The Pamulinawen Boys eventually emerged as 2nd best in the National Finals. Ms. Julia Cruz, Home Economics teacher was adjudged Most Outstanding teacher in her field in that same year. When Dr. Hilario M. Galvez took over the reign of principalship, the school continued its winning streak in various scholastics contest. In 1980, the EAHS Evening Vocational School started to serve the out-of-school youth in the vicinity of the school.

In 1982 during the principalship of Dr. Carmen S. Llenarizas, 4 Abadans were sent to Aomori, Japan as Manila delegates to the Aomori UNESCO Exchange Students Program. The school continue to win prestigious contests in different arena placing 3rd in the Division Reading Proficiency Contest, 2nd in the Science Radio Newscast Writing Contest and 1st in the NCR Science Journalism Competition. The improvement of the school was pursued by the succeeding principals: Ms. Edy Losaria extended the guidance and counselling center and the school canteen to better serve the ever-growing school population; Ms. Milagros M. Palomares initiated the construction of Science building as well as the construction of the awning in the quadrangle, Mr Pablo D. Aseoche's short term marked improvement in the Principal's Office.

In 1989, a sophomore Abadan was chosen as Manila's representative to the International Conference of Juvenile Scientists in Yokohama, Japan under the Yokohama Young Scientists Exchange Program. That same year, Principal Rebecca Nava started the construction of the Maceda I Building. The building replaced the old Marcos Pre-fab one-storey building. The building now housed the Home Economics classes.

Mrs. Susan A. Yano's greatest accomplishment when she was principal was the removal of squatters in front of the school. She sought the assistance of then Mayor Alfredo S. Lim. The removal of the shanties paved the way for improved safer school environment. Mrs. Yano initiated the construction of the Conference Room which became the venue of many student activities and faculty meetings. She also purchase a service vehicle for the school.

Other lady-principals who made great contribution to the school were Ms. Elena L. Batusan who spearheaded the construction of Maceda II Science Building with three floors, Dr. Agnes B. Pajares introduced the mural paintings in the main gate, Mrs. Rosita C. Herson who renovated the boys’ and girls’ comfort rooms, purchase of the school's second van and the construction of the computer laboratory, and Dr. Imelda M. Mendez started the tilling of the ground floor of the main building. The fourth gentle man who headed the school was Mr. Gene T. Pangilinan. He continued the construction of the 4th and 5th floors of the Science Building, the mini gymnasium, the rehabilitation of decades old roofs of the school.

Mr. Fernando B. Orines, is the first and only alumnus-principal of the school. His greatest achievement to date is the adoption of School-based Management which paved the way for the establishment of School Governing Council. This policy-making body of 21 stakeholders composed of administrators, teachers, student, alumnus, retired teacher, parent, NGO leader, and barangay officials. Added to his credit is the establishment of SEC-recognized EAHS Alumni Association Incorporated (EAHSAAI). This worldwide organization spearheaded the renovation of the school library and built the Guidance Counselling Center and Audio Visual Room. Batch 2010, ranked 4th in National Career Assessment Examination (NCAE). The highest in the History of Esteban Abada. All boys dance group gave championship in the field of dancing. Rank 1st out of 32 schools. This administration and batch, gave a lot of history in Esteban Abada High School.

Mr. Romarico Barrientos, EAHS Principal after Mr. Orines, has secured a 2 Million pesos donation from the Department of Public Works enabling him to renovate the Conference Room at the ground floor and the Principal's Office. The EAHSAAI also contributed in the beautification project by donating magnetic whiteboards, repainting some classrooms and installing alumni sponsors' laminated room number plates. The school received countless of donations from soccer balls, table tennis set and tables, air conditioning units, 2 sets of sound systems, 2 electric floor polishers, many cans of floorwax, 100 monoblock chairs to 32-inch television set among others.

Former Principals

Mapping

Internal
Esteban Abada High School is located along Blumentritt street, a catch basin for a knee-high flood during rainy days between Maria Clara and Simon streets Sampaloc, Manila.
The school is bounded  by four barangays of Manila ( 482-484, 492-501 ) and also situated along boundary of Manila and Quezon City. Landmarks located nearby the school include the famous La Loma Lechon area, the Chinese General Hospital and Medical Center, the Manila North Cemetery and the PLDT tower.
Our feeder schools;
 Albert Elementary School at Dapitan street
 Laong Laan Elementary School along Blumentritt street
 Juan Sumulong Elementary School along Dimasalang street.

External links 

 Official website

Educational institutions established in 1963
High schools in Manila
Education in Sampaloc, Manila
1963 establishments in the Philippines